Long Palai is a settlement in the Marudi division of Sarawak, Malaysia.

Long Palai is located on the Baram River in the Ulu Baram region of the interior of Sarawak, upstream from Long Anap. The people belong to the Kenyah tribe.

Neighbouring settlements include:

References

External links
 Photographs of Long Palai

Populated places in Sarawak